Bai Rubing (1912–1994) was a People's Republic of China politician. He was born in Qingjian County, Shaanxi Province. He joined the Chinese Communist Party in 1928. He was a member of the Chinese Workers' and Peasants' Red Army and Eighth Route Army. He was Chinese Communist Party Committee Secretary and two time governor of Shandong Province. He was a relative of Bai Dongcai, Communist Party Chief and governor of Jiangxi Province, and Bai Enpei, governor and Communist Party Chief of Qinghai Province and Communist Party Chief of Yunnan Province.

References 

1912 births
1994 deaths
People's Republic of China politicians from Shaanxi
Chinese Communist Party politicians from Shaanxi
Governors of Shandong
Political office-holders in Shandong
CPPCC Committee Chairmen of Shandong
People from Qingjian County